Hoyvík is a town in the Faroe Islands. It is part of the Tórshavn Municipality, and de facto is merged as a northern suburb of Tórshavn, the Faroese capital.

History 

Hoyvík is believed to be a very old settlement. An early source is the Færeyinga saga, a 13th-century recollection of earlier Viking oral recounts. 

Before the late 20th century the population was very low. Until the mid 19th century the entire population comprised one farm. A few more houses were built close to the farmland after the Second World War. A real development boom has been in Hoyvík since about the early 1980s. The new houses have been built on land that was formerly considered farmer outfields. The architecture of some of these newer houses include detached and terraced housing.

Notable facts 
A 17th-century farmhouse functions today as an open-air museum, part of the National Museum of the Faroe Islands.
Important institutions in Hoyvík are the gymnasium and the Faroese Historical Museum. The first church in Hoyvík was finished in 2007.
In 2005 a free trade agreement between the Faroe Islands and Iceland was signed in Hoyvík at the Historical Museum. It is consequently known as the Hoyvík Agreement.

See also
FC Hoyvík
Hoyvík Agreement
List of towns in the Faroe Islands

References

External links

Faroeislands.dk: Hoyvík Images and description of all cities on the Faroe Islands.

 
Populated places in the Faroe Islands